Arsenic poisoning, accidental or deliberate, has been implicated in the illness and death of a number of prominent people throughout history.

 Tapan Misra
 Tapan Misra is an Indian scientist who was the director of Space Applications Centre, Indian Space Research Organisation. He received Vikram Sarabhai Research Award in 2004 and ISRO Merit award in 2008 for his contribution of development of SAR technology. He was attacked by arsenic in 2017. 

 Vikram Sarabhai
 Vikram Ambalal Sarabhai (12 August 1919 – 30 December 1971) was an Indian physicist and astronomer who initiated space research and helped develop nuclear power in India. He was honoured with Padma Bhushan in 1966 and the Padma Vibhushan (posthumously) in 1972. He is internationally regarded as the Father of the Indian Space Program. It is known that he died because of arsenic mixed in his food. The case is closed.   

 Francesco I de' Medici, Grand Duke of Tuscany
 Recent forensic evidence uncovered by Italian scientists suggests that Francesco (1541–1587) and his wife were poisoned, possibly by his brother and successor Ferdinando.

 Eric XIV of Sweden
 Towards the end of his life, king Eric XIV (1533–1577) was held prisoner in many different castles in both Sweden and Finland. He died in prison in Örbyhus Castle: according to a tradition starting with Johannes Messenius, his final meal was a poisoned bowl of pea soup. A document signed by his brother, John III of Sweden, and a nobleman, Bengt Bengtsson Gylta (1514–74), gave Eric's guards in his last prison authorization to poison him if anyone tried to release him. His body was exhumed in 1958 and modern forensic analysis revealed evidence of lethal arsenic poisoning.

 George III of Great Britain
 George III's (1738–1820) personal health was a concern throughout his long reign. He suffered from periodic episodes of physical and mental illness, five of them disabling enough to require the King to withdraw from his duties. In 1969, researchers asserted that the episodes of madness and other physical symptoms were characteristic of the disease porphyria, which was also identified in members of his immediate and extended family. In addition, a 2004 study of samples of the King's hair revealed extremely high levels of arsenic, which is a possible trigger of disease symptoms. A 2005 article in the medical journal The Lancet suggested the source of the arsenic could be the antimony used as a consistent element of the King's medical treatment. The two minerals are often found in the same ground, and mineral extraction at the time was not precise enough to eliminate arsenic from compounds containing antimony.

 Theodor Ursinus
 Theodor Gottlieb Ursinus (1749–1800), a high-ranking Prussian civil servant and justice official, was poisoned by his wife Charlotte Ursinus (1760–1836). At the time, his death was ruled a stroke, but soon after the widow was found to have poisoned, between 1797 and 1801, not only her husband, but also her aunt and her lover, as well as to have attempted to poison her servant in 1803. Her sensational trial led to the first reliable method of identifying arsenic poisoning.

 Napoleon Bonaparte
 It has been suggested that Napoleon Bonaparte (1769–1821) suffered and died from arsenic poisoning during his imprisonment on the island of Saint Helena. Forensic samples of his hair did show high levels, 13 times the normal amount, of the element. This, however, does not prove deliberate poisoning by Napoleon's enemies: copper arsenite has been used as a pigment in some wallpapers, and microbiological liberation of the arsenic into the immediate environment would be possible. The case is equivocal in the absence of clearly authenticated samples of the wallpaper. Samples of hair taken during Napoleon's lifetime also show levels of arsenic, so that arsenic from the soil could not have polluted the post-mortem sample. Even without contaminated wallpaper or soil, commercial use of arsenic at the time provided many other routes by which Napoleon could have consumed enough arsenic to leave this forensic trace.

 Simón Bolívar
 South American independence leader Simón Bolívar (1783–1830), according to Paul Auwaerter from the Division of Infectious Diseases in the Department of Medicine at the Johns Hopkins University School of Medicine, may have died due to chronic arsenic poisoning further complicated by bronchiectasis and lung cancer. Auwaerter has considered murder and acute arsenic poisoning unlikely, arguing that gradual "environmental contact with arsenic would have been entirely possible" as a result of drinking contaminated water in Peru or through the medicinal use of arsenic (which was common at the time) as Bolívar had reportedly resorted to it during the treatment for some of his illnesses.

 Charles Francis Hall
 American explorer Charles Francis Hall (1821–1871) died unexpectedly during his third journey to the Arctic, the Polaris expedition. After returning to the ship from a sledging expedition Hall drank a cup of coffee and fell violently ill.

 He collapsed in what was described as a fit. He suffered from vomiting and delirium for the next week, then seemed to improve for a few days. He accused several of the ship's company, including the ship's physician Emil Bessels—with whom he had longstanding disagreements—of having poisoned him. Shortly thereafter, Hall again began suffering the same symptoms, died, and was taken ashore for burial. Following the expedition's return a U.S. Navy investigation ruled that Hall had died from apoplexy.

 In 1968, however, Hall's biographer Chauncey C. Loomis, a professor at Dartmouth College, traveled to Greenland to exhume Hall's body. Due to the permafrost, Hall's body, flag shroud, clothing, and coffin were remarkably well preserved. Tissue samples of bone, fingernails, and hair showed that Hall died of poisoning from large doses of arsenic in the last two weeks of his life, consistent with the symptoms party members reported. It is possible that he was murdered by Bessels or one of the other members of the expedition.

 Clare Boothe Luce
 Clare Boothe Luce (1903–1987), the American ambassador to Italy from 1953 to 1956, did not die from arsenic poisoning, but suffered an increasing variety of physical and psychological symptoms until arsenic was implicated. Its source was traced to the flaking arsenic-laden paint on the ceiling of her bedroom. She may also have eaten food contaminated by arsenic in flaking ceiling paint in the embassy dining room.

 Guangxu Emperor
 In 2008, testing in the People's Republic of China confirmed that the Guangxu Emperor (1871–1908) was poisoned with a massive dose of arsenic; suspects include his dying aunt, Empress Dowager Cixi, and her strongman, Yuan Shikai.

 Phar Lap
 The famous and largely successful New Zealand-bred racehorse Phar Lap died suddenly in 1932. Poisoning was considered as a cause of death and several forensic examinations were completed at the time of death. In a recent examination, 75 years after his death, forensic scientists determined that the horse had ingested a massive dose of arsenic shortly before his death.

 King Faisal I of Iraq
 According to his British nurse, Lady Badget, King Faisal I of Iraq suffered from symptoms similar to those of arsenic poisoning during his last visit to Switzerland for treatment in 1933, at the age of 48. His Swiss doctors found him in a very healthy situation a day before.

 Anderson Mazoka
 The popular opposition leader in Zambia, Anderson Mazoka, whose health deteriorated after the 2001 presidential elections, repeatedly accused government agents of poisoning him. His daughter, Mutinta, confirmed after his death on 24 May 2006 that arsenic was found in his body after he died from kidney complications.

 Munir Said Thalib
 Munir Said Thalib, an Indonesian human right and anti-corruption activist, was poisoned with arsenic onboard Garuda Indonesia flight from Jakarta to Amsterdam on September 7, 2004. The Netherlands Forensic Institute revealed that Munir's body contained a level of arsenic almost three times the lethal dose. Pollycarpus Budihari Priyanto, an active pilot at the time of the assassination, was found guilty of murder. Despite the guilty verdict, the circumstances surrounding the case remained unclear.

 Emmerson Mnangagwa
 Robert Mugabe's successor as President of Zimbabwe, Emmerson Mnangagwa has claimed he was poisoned with arsenic at a rally. His entourage has suggested that supporters of Grace Mugabe were responsible.

 Joyce Moriku
 Ugandan minister for primary health care, Dr. Joyce Moriku, revealed to the Daily Monitor in 2018 that unknown people had poisoned her the previous year. This was after toxicological investigations in Ugandan and South African laboratories confirmed the presence of arsenic poison in her body.

References 

Arsenic
Poisoning by drugs, medicaments and biological substances